Russula firmula is a species of mushroom found in Europe and parts of Asia that has a dull brown cap, varying in color from grey to a light purple. It is one of about 750 species in the genus Russula, which is distributed worldwide.

firmula